Sante "Santos" Pucello (born 1971, Frosinone, Italy) is an Italian DJ and musician. In 1992, he started making music with his friend, and he recorded his first record two years later.

In 1995, Mantra Vibes released his track "The Piano". In 2001, "Camels" peaked at #9 in the UK Singles Chart, following support from Pete Tong, Annie Nightingale, Judge Jules and Basement Jaxx. Soon after, his first album, R U Shakadelic? was released.

References

1971 births
Living people
People from Frosinone
Club DJs
Italian DJs
Date of birth missing (living people)
Electronic dance music DJs